Dothiorella aromatica is a fungal plant pathogen that causes fruit rot of avocado.

References

External links
 USDA ARS Fungal Database

Fungal tree pathogens and diseases
Avocado tree diseases
aromatica
Fungi described in 1927